Gary Wood is an independent filmmaker from Indianapolis, Indiana. He started screenwriting during his six-year service in the U.S. Navy. "Long days aboard the U.S.S. Nassau gave him time to hone his writing," and "once out of the Navy, he kept on writing, whenever possible, while working in a variety of businesses."

In 2001 he wrote a script for Saving Star Wars, "which became a cult movie hit about two Star Wars fans who accidentally kidnap George Lucas."  Wood also penned the film Open Mic'Rs, a mockumentary that includes improvisation by stand-up comedians made in Indianapolis.

Works
My Kid Brother's Band about a visit by guitarist George Harrison to his sister's home in Benton, Illinois in 1963, a year before he and The Beatles "invaded" the United States. ("A tiny Benton radio station was actually the first to play a Beatles record in '63, after considerable begging by George and his sis, Louise.")
Sissies (movie) about two sisters "living totally different lifestyles."
One Wild and Crazy City a documentary about the "long-lost connection between comedian Steve Martin and Terre Haute".
Open Mic'rs a mockumentary made in Indianapolis that includes improvisations from comedians.
Saving Star Wars (writer and producer)

Open Mic'rs

The movie was filmed in Indiana in 2005. Gary Wood (filmmaker) was the producer and director. Actors in the movie include Rupert Boneham, Cindy Morgan, David Prowse and Landon Lueck.

Open Mic'rs premiered at the IMAX Theater in Indianapolis in 2006. Open Mic'rs is a mockumentary that includes improvisations of comedians. The feature was made in Indianapolis.

References

American male screenwriters
Writers from Indianapolis
American documentary filmmakers
Living people
Screenwriters from Indiana
Year of birth missing (living people)